Saint-Céneré is a former commune in the Mayenne department and Pays de la Loire region of France.

Background
On 1 January 2017, it was merged into the new commune Montsûrs-Saint-Céneré. On 1 January 2019 the comune was unified with Deux-Évailles, Montourtier and Saint-Ouën-des-Vallons, and the new municipality took the name of Montsûrs. Its population was 471 in 2019.

See also 

 Communes of the Mayenne department

References 

Saintcenere
Maine (province)